Caspar Corbeau (born 3 April 2001) is a Dutch American swimmer, representing the Netherlands at international competitions. He competed at the 2020 European Aquatics Championships in the 100 metre breaststroke and 200 metre breaststroke. He also competed at the 2020 Summer Olympics in the 100 metre breaststroke and 200 metre breaststroke.

He competes collegiately at the University of Texas where he is majoring in kinesiology .

Personal bests

References

2001 births
Living people
Dutch male medley swimmers
Dutch male breaststroke swimmers
Texas Longhorns men's swimmers
Swimmers at the 2018 Summer Youth Olympics
Swimmers at the 2020 Summer Olympics
Olympic swimmers of the Netherlands